William Pascal Kikoti (March 3, 1957 – August 28, 2012) was the Roman Catholic bishop of the Roman Catholic Diocese of Mpanda, Tanzania.

Ordained to the priesthood in 1988, Kikoti was named bishop in 2000; he died in office.

Notes

21st-century Roman Catholic bishops in Tanzania
1957 births
2012 deaths
Roman Catholic bishops of Mpanda